Mawtinzun Pagoda, officially known as the Mahāmakuṭaraṃsi Hsandawshin Myat Mawtin Pagoda, is a Buddhist pagoda in Ngapudaw Township, Ayeyarwady Region, Myanmar (Burma). The pagoda is located along the Cape of Mawtin on the Andaman Sea. The pagoda is submerged underwater throughout the year, except during the pagoda festival season. Mawtinzun Pagoda Festival is held annually during the traditional Burmese month of Tabaung. In 2015, over 5,000 tourists attended the festival.

See also 

 Buddhism in Myanmar

References 

Pagodas in Myanmar
Buildings and structures in Ayeyarwady Region